Eros Beraldo (27 July 1929 – 27 December 2004) was an Italian footballer, who played as a midfielder, and football manager.

Honours

Club 
A.C. Milan
Serie A: 1954–55, 1956–57, 1958–59
Latin Cup: 1956

External links 
Profile at MagliaRossonera.it 

1929 births
2004 deaths
Italian footballers
Serie A players
Association football midfielders
Calcio Padova players
A.C. Milan players
Genoa C.F.C. players
A.C. Cesena players
Italian football managers
Calcio Padova managers